Sylvana Durrett is director of special projects at Vogue  and co-founder and CEO of Maisonette.

Durrett is the daughter of actress, Rosanna DeSoto and screenwriter David S. Ward. She graduated from Princeton University in 2003 with a Bachelor's degree in English Literature and began her career at Vogue as an assistant to Editor-in-Chief Anna Wintour.

Durrett is known for producing the annual Costume Institute Met Gala as well as producing and appearing in the film The First Monday in May. She has also worked on The Fashion Fund which focuses on the business aspect of fashion.

References

American women film producers
American film producers
Living people
Year of birth missing (living people)
Place of birth missing (living people)
21st-century American women